The Minister for Co-operative Societies, later Minister for Cooperatives was a ministry in the government of New South Wales, with responsibility for regulating and registering co-operative societies, including housing societies, friendly societies, Starr-Bowkett Societies, credit unions and building societies. It has had three iterations, from September 1949 until February 1983, from February 1986 until March 1988 and from June 1991 until April 1995.

Role and responsibilities
The Registrar of Co-Operative Societies was established under the Building and Co-operative Societies Act 1901. The Registrar of Co-operative Societies could inquire into the working and financial condition of a society or authorise any public servant, accountant, or actuary to inspect any minutes or books or to examine into, and report upon, the affairs of a society. In 1923 and advisory council was established by the Co-operation, Community Settlement and Credit Act 1923, to make recommendations to the Treasurer. The Council submitted recommendations about the rules and regulations relating to societies and any action to be taken by the Treasurer, including the appointment of committees. The Registrar of Co-operative Societies was an ex officio member of the Council and the Treasurer could attend any meeting, and would preside over such meetings. The ministerial position was created in a ministerial reshuffle in the second McGirr ministry October 1949 with responsibilities transferring from the Treasurer to the Minister for Co-operative Societies. The inaugural minister Clarrie Martin held the portfolio in addition to his portfolio of Attorney–General.

From February 1983 the ministerial responsibilities were transferred to the Minister for Housing. The responsibilities were transferred to the Attorney General in January 1986, with the portfolio being formally re-created in February 1986 and filled by Terry Sheahan, who was also the Attorney General. The portfolio was abolished in the first Greiner ministry in March 1988 with the responsibilities allocated to the Minister for Business and Consumer Affairs. It was re-created in the second Greiner ministry. It was abolished in April 1995 and the responsibilities transferred to the Minister for Business and Consumer Affairs.

List of ministers

References

Co-operative Societies